Human Genetics Alert (abbreviated HGA) is a secular, independent watchdog group based in London, England. It advocates against uses of reproductive technology and human genetics research that it considers harmful.

History
Human Genetics Alert was founded in 1999 as the Campaign Against Human Genetic Engineering. It was reborn as Human Genetics Alert (HGA) in December 2000, at which point it began to receive funding from the Joseph Rowntree Charitable Trust. HGA stopped receiving funding from the Joseph Rowntree Charitable Trust in 2005. As of December 2018, its director was David King.

Positions
Human Genetics Alert states that it is not opposed to all genetics research, but that it is opposed to certain proposed uses of it, including human genetic engineering, human cloning, and genetic discrimination. The organization has also opposed prenatal sex selection and the proposal that led to the establishment of the UK Biobank.

References

External links
 

Bioethics research organizations
Genetics in the United Kingdom
Genetics organizations
Organizations established in 1999
Organisations based in London
1999 establishments in England